Patrick Obermüller (born 17 February 1999) is an Austrian footballer who plays for SK Rapid Wien II.

Career

Club career
Obermüller began his career at SC Klosterneuburg 1912. For the 2011/12 season he joined the academy of Rapid Wien.

In November 2016 he made his debut for the reserve team of SK Rapid Wien in the Austrian Regionalliga when he was in the starting line-up against FCM Traiskirchen on matchday 14 of the 2016/17 season. In that game he was sent off after two yellow cards in the 72nd minute. In October 2017 he scored his first goal in the Regionalliga against FC Stadlau.

In May 2019, Obermüller made his debut for the Rapid's professional team in the Austrian Football Bundesliga, when he was in the starting line-up against SCR Altach on matchday 32 of the 2018/19 season and in the 69th minute was replaced by Mario Sonnleitner.

For the 2019/20 season he was loaned out to TSV Hartberg. After playing only four games for the club, he was instead loaned out to the Austrian Football Second League club SV Ried in February 2020. By the end of the loan, he made eleven appearances for Ried in the 2nd division. He helped the team with promotion to the Bundesliga in that season.

After the end of the loan, he returned to Rapid, where he was registered for the reserve team, which had been promoted to the 2nd division.

References

External links

Living people
1999 births
Association football defenders
Austrian footballers
Austria youth international footballers
SK Rapid Wien players
TSV Hartberg players
SV Ried players
Austrian Football Bundesliga players
2. Liga (Austria) players
Austrian Regionalliga players